Makheka is a community council located in the Maseru District of Lesotho. The population in 2006 was 5,473.

Villages
The community of Makheka includes the villages of Foranteng, Ha 'Malebatsi, Ha Andreas, Ha Chadwick, Ha Chechane, Ha Elia, Ha Fochane, Ha John (Khorong), Ha Keleke, Ha Lerumonyane, Ha Mafonyoko, Ha Mahlomola, Ha Makubeletsane, Ha Malete, Ha Mankata, Ha Mantša, Ha Marai, Ha Mateu, Ha Molai, Ha Moleko, Ha Molomo, Ha Moseme, Ha Mphafolane, Ha Mphephe, Ha Ramokhobo, Ha Ramokone, Ha Ramosebo, Ha Sekantši, Ha Sekoati, Ha Setenane, Ha Setere, Ha Setofolo, Ha Tabo, Ha Taole, Ha Totlelase, Ha Tšepo, Ha Tsese, Ha Tsokotsa, Khohlong, Khubetsoana, Likhameng, Mamphokoane, Matsatsaneng, Matsatseng, Meritjaneng, Moeaneng, Phootle, Qhatseng, Serutle and Thoteng.

References

External links
 Google map of community villages

Populated places in Maseru District